The Osse is a  long river in southwestern France, right tributary of the river Gélise.

Its course crosses the following départements and communes:

 Hautes-Pyrénées: Bernadets-Debat
 Gers: Montesquiou, Saint-Arailles, Vic-Fezensac, Mouchan
 Lot-et-Garonne: Fréchou, Moncrabeau, Lannes

References

Rivers of France
Rivers of Occitania (administrative region)
Rivers of Nouvelle-Aquitaine
Rivers of Hautes-Pyrénées
Rivers of Gers
Rivers of Lot-et-Garonne